Blue Ridge is a hamlet in northwest Alberta, Canada within Woodlands County.

Economy 
A lumber mill to the north of Blue Ridge, operated by Blue Ridge Lumber Inc., is the main employer for the community.  The hamlet also offers services to the oil and gas industry and the surrounding agricultural community.

Demographics 

See also 
List of communities in Alberta
List of designated places in Alberta
List of hamlets in Alberta

References 

Hamlets in Alberta
Designated places in Alberta
Woodlands County